Odie Harris (born April 1, 1966, in Bryan, Texas) is a former professional American football player who played safety and cornerback for eight seasons in the National Football League.

External links
http://www.bucpower.com/odie-harris.html

1966 births
Living people
Players of American football from San Antonio
American football cornerbacks
American football safeties
Sam Houston Bearkats football players
Tampa Bay Buccaneers players
Cleveland Browns players
Phoenix Cardinals players
Arizona Cardinals players
Houston Oilers players